Sir Arthur "Richard" Jolly,  (born 30 June 1934) is a leading development economist who was named one of the fifty key thinkers globally in this field of economics.

Jolly currently serves as Honorary Professor and Research Associate of the Institute of Development Studies at the University of Sussex focusing on issues of world development and the role of the UN in global governance. From 1982 to 2000 he was an Assistant Secretary-General of the UN, first as deputy executive director of UNICEF and from 1996 as Coordinator of the UNDP’s Human Development Report. He co-authored the influential book Adjustment with a human face: protecting the vulnerable and promoting growth.

Biography 
The son of Arthur Jolly, a chartered accountant, by his wife Flora née Leaver, a commissioner for the Girl Guides, he attended Brighton College before going up to Magdalene College, Cambridge and graduating with first-class honours in Economics in 1956. Facing National Service, he applied for exemption from military service as a conscientious objector, which was granted conditional upon work as a Rehabilitation Officer in Kenya. In 1958 Jolly pursued postgraduate studies at Yale University, receiving a PhD in 1962.

In 1959 Jolly was secretary of the British Alpine Hannibal Expedition, which sought to recreate Hannibal's route across the Alps with the aid of an elephant. This expedition resulted in Jolly's first published article "Hannibal's route across the Alps: results of an empirical test".

Jolly was appointed Research Fellow at the East Africa Institute of Social Research in 1963, advising on manpower to the Government of Zambia (1964–66), and Research Officer in Applied Economics at Cambridge University (1964–68).

Appointed a Fellow of the Institute of Development Studies in 1969, Jolly became its director from 1972 until 1981; in 1972, he co-directed with Hans Singer the ILO Employment Mission to Kenya, published as Employment, Incomes and Equality. He also served as Special Consultant on North-South issues to the Secretary-General of the OECD in 1978, and from 1978 to 1981 was a member and rapporteur of the UN Committee on Development Planning.

From 1982 to 1995 he was deputy executive director in UNICEF, with responsibilities for UNICEF's programmes in over 130 countries of the world, including UNICEF's strategy for support to countries in reducing child mortality and implementing the goals agreed at the 1990 World Summit for Children. In UNICEF, he was also directly involved in efforts to ensure more attention to the needs of children and women in the making of economic adjustment policies, and co-authored the book Adjustment with a Human Face. During this period, from 1982 to 1985, he was vice president of the Society for International Development and from 1987 to 1996, was Chairman of its North/South Roundtable.

From 1996 to 2000 Jolly became Special Adviser to the Administrator of the United Nations Development Programme and principal coordinator of the widely acclaimed Human Development Report

As a senior UN officer, Jolly was much involved with reforming and ensuring collaboration between its operational agencies. From 1996 to 2000 he chaired the system-wide UN Sub-Committee on Nutrition (SCN) and from 2000 to 2007 the Water Supply and Sanitation Collaborative Council (WSSCC), both of which prepared major reports setting out global goals and strategies for reducing malnutrition and ensuring access to hygiene, sanitation and water on a worldwide basis.

As co-director of the UN Intellectual History Project (1999–2010), he oversaw the production of the 17 volume history of the UN's contributions to economic and social development covering the ideas emerging and promoted by the UN since 1945. He was the senior author of the final volume, UN Ideas that Changed the World and a co-author of five others, three of which were recognized by Choice magazine as outstanding academic books of the year. One of these volumes, UN Voices: the Struggle for Social Justice and Development, contains summaries of in-depth interviews of the leadership and experiences of the four living Secretaries-General and 75 other senior UN officials.

Other publications which Jolly has co-authored include five of the volumes of the UN Intellectual History, five Human Development Reports (1996 to 2000), Development with a Human Face; Adjustment with a Human Face; The UN and the Bretton Woods Institutions: New Challenges for the 21st Century; Disarmament and World Development; Planning Education for African Development and numerous scholarly articles.

Sir Richard has served as a trustee of OXFAM, Chairman of the UN Association of the United Kingdom and as an Overseas Development Institute Member of Council.

International appointments 

 Honorary Vice-President of the British Association of Former UN Civil Servants
 Member of the Independent Advisory Panel for the One World Trust's Global Accountability Project
 Senior Research Fellow at The CUNY Graduate Center
 The Headstrong Society - UNDP (Chairman 1998)
 The Headstrong Society - Columbia University (2001–present)
 Joint Founding Editor of the Journal of Human Development and Capabilities.

Honours

Orders and decorations 
  - KCMG for "contributions to international development" 
  - UN Medal for "International Conference on the Former Yugoslavia"

Academic distinctions 
 1998: Hon. LittD (UEA) 
 1992: Hon. DLitt (Sussex) 
 2007: Hon. PhD (Erasmus)
 2001: Hon. Fellow (Magdalene Coll, Cantab)

Civic awards 
 Freeman of the City of London
 Master of the Worshipful Company of Curriers.

Personal life 
Jolly married Alison Bishop in 1963. Later formally styled Lady Jolly, she was a noted primatologist until her death on 6 February 2014; they had four children.

Sir Richard divides his time between Sussex and London.

Principal works

Papers 
  Pdf version.

References

External links
 Debrett's People of Today
 Profile at the Institute of Development Studies
 Profile at the UN Intellectual History Project
 Profile at The International Institute of Social Studies
 The achievements of a cheerful economist. By John Toye. Chapter based on three interviews with Richard Jolly conducted during 2011.
 Transcript of Sir Richard Jolly interview. By Thomas G. Weiss. New York, 20 July 2005 (150 page interview)
 Daniel Jakopovich interviews Sir Richard Jolly: Demilitarisation requires visionary leadership

1934 births
Academics of the University of Sussex
Alumni of Magdalene College, Cambridge
British conscientious objectors
British development economists
Knights Commander of the Order of St Michael and St George
Living people
Yale University alumni
British officials of the United Nations